Daphnella bedoyai is a species of sea snail, a marine gastropod mollusk in the family Raphitomidae.

References

bedoyai
Gastropods described in 1998